Hettienne Park (born March 7, 1983) is an American actress and writer, having played roles in Year of the Fish (2007), Bride Wars (2009), Blindspot (2018), The Outsider (2020), her most notable role being Beverly Katz on the Psychological horror television series Hannibal (2013–14).

Early life and education
Park was born in Boston, raised in Wayland, Massachusetts, and is of South Korean descent. She received her Bachelor of Arts in Religion and Economics from the University of Rochester.  Park studied classical flute and piano at the New England Conservatory of Music in Boston, Massachusetts. and studied acting for 2 years at the William Esper Studio in New York City.

Career
Park's first role as an actress was in a junior high school production of “Cats”. Her screen debut was in the 2007 movie Year of the Fish. Park is known for supporting roles in such films as Don't Look Up, Bride Wars and Young Adult. She starred as Special Agent Beverly Katz, a crime-scene investigator specializing in fiber analysis, in the television series Hannibal, alongside Mads Mikkelsen who plays Hannibal Lecter, and Hugh Dancy. Park starred as Tamika Collins in Stephen King's The Outsider on HBO.

Park was a recipient of the 68th Theatre World Award for Outstanding Broadway and Off-Broadway debuts for Theresa Rebeck's Seminar and The Intelligent Homosexual's Guide to Capitalism and Socialism with a Key to the Scriptures'' by Tony Kushner.

Filmography

Film

Television

Video games

Theatre

Awards and nominations

References

External links
 

1973 births
21st-century American actresses
Actresses from Boston
American film actresses
American actresses of Korean descent
American people of South Korean descent
American television actresses
American voice actresses
Living people
New England Conservatory alumni
People from Wayland, Massachusetts
University of Rochester alumni
Theatre World Award winners
William Esper Studio alumni